Reiðhöllin is an indoor arena located in Reykjavík, Iceland, which is used primarily as an equestrian center. The hall is just over 1,800 m2 in size; 26 meters wide and 70 meters long. It has also hosted concerts, including performances by Kiss in 1988 and Whitesnake in 1990.

References

Indoor arenas in Iceland
Sports venues in Reykjavík